Sithamalli is a village of Mannargudi Taluk in Tiruvarur district  Tamil Nadu, India. Muthupet is a nearby town.

References 

Villages in Tiruvarur district